1997 Summer Universiade
U
Universiade